Roman cuisine comes from the Italian city of Rome. It features fresh, seasonal and simply-prepared ingredients from the Roman Campagna. These include peas, globe artichokes and fava beans, shellfish, milk-fed lamb and goat, and cheeses such as Pecorino Romano and ricotta. Olive oil is used mostly to dress raw vegetables, while strutto (pork lard) and fat from prosciutto are preferred for frying. The most popular sweets in Rome are small individual pastries called pasticcini, gelato (ice cream) and handmade chocolates and candies. Special dishes are often reserved for different days of the week; for example, gnocchi is eaten on Thursdays, baccalà (salted cod) on Fridays, and trippa on Saturdays.

History

Rome's food has evolved through centuries and periods of social, cultural, and political changes. Rome became a major gastronomical center during the ancient age. Ancient Roman cuisine was mainly based on cereals, cheeses, legumes and fruit. Subsequently, the empire's enormous expansion exposed Romans to many new, provincial culinary habits and cooking techniques. In the beginning, the differences between social classes were not very great, but disparities developed with the empire's growth. Later, during the Italian Renaissance, Rome became well known as a center of high-cuisine, since some of the best chefs of the time worked for the popes. An example of this could be Bartolomeo Scappi, who was a chef working for Pius IV in the Vatican kitchen, reaching fame with his cookbook Opera dell'arte del cucinare, published in 1570. Here he lists approximately 1000 recipes of Renaissance cuisine and describes cooking techniques and tools, giving the first known picture of a fork.
Roman and all Italian cuisine were transformationally influenced by the introduction of new world crops by the Spanish, especially the tomato.

Traditional cucina Romana
The Testaccio rione, Rome's trade and slaughterhouse area, is the place where Rome's most original and traditional foods can still be found. The area was often known as the "belly" or "slaughterhouse" of Rome, and was inhabited by butchers, or vaccinari. The most common or ancient Roman cuisine included the "fifth quarter". Popular foods include pig's trotters, brain, and the genitals of other animals, which were often carefully cooked and richly spiced with different savouries, spices and herbs. The old-fashioned coda alla vaccinara (oxtail cooked in the way of butchers) is still one of the city's most popular meals and is part of most of Rome's restaurants' menus. Lamb is also a very popular part of Roman cuisine, and is often roasted with spices and herbs. There is a considerable Jewish influence in Roman cuisine, since many Jews lived in the city, and some of the traditional meals of the ghetto date back over 400 years. Such include the carciofi alla giudia (Jewish-style artichokes), Jewish courgettes and the Pizza dolce di Beridde.

Pasta in Rome
Pasta is one important element of Roman cuisine. Famous Roman pasta dishes include cacio e pepe (cheese and black pepper), gricia (a sauce made with guanciale and hard cheese, typically Pecorino Romano), carbonara (like gricia but with the addition of egg), and amatriciana (like gricia but with the addition of tomato). Alfredo (invented in Rome by the chef of restaurant "Alfredo alla Scrofa") is famous abroad, but not considered traditional and mostly unheard of in Rome.

There used to be a pasta museum in Rome called the Museo Nazionale della Paste Alimentari (the National Museum of Pasta), but now there is a hotel there. Rome's most common pasta shape is spaghetti, but there are many other forms.

Beverages
The city is known as a center of white wine. Frascati and Castelli Romani have been called the best ones in the city.

Other elements of Roman food
There are also many other dishes in Roman cuisine, including several desserts and sweets, many of which are made with ricotta cheese. Typical of Rome is the grattachecca.

Dishes

 Abbacchio alla cacciatora – floured lamb chops cooked in olive oil, white wine and white wine vinegar, spiced with garlic, sage, anchovies and rosemary. 
Bucatini all'amatriciana – pasta dish with tomato sauce, guanciale, and grated Pecorino Romano.
Bruschetta – a popular antipasto or appetizer in central Italy. It comes from the Romanesco word 'bread which is lightly burnt' and it's typically rubbed with garlic and topped with olive oil and tomatoes.
Cacio e pepe – pasta dish with a sauce made with black pepper and grated Pecorino Romano. 
 Carciofi alla romana – whole artichokes filled with minced garlic and parsley and cooked in olive oil.
 Carciofi alla giudia (Jewish-style artichokes) - whole artichokes deep-fried in olive oil.
 Coda alla vaccinara – oxtail stew, either cooked with tomato sauce, bitter chocolate, celery, clove, white wine, lard and onions, or with tomato sauce, celery, dark cocoa, pine nuts and raisins.
 Coppiette (couples) – stripes of dried meat (pork or horse), usually spicy.
Crostata di ricotta – tart made with ricotta, sometimes flavoured with lemons (or oranges) and Marsala wine.
 Fiori di zucca – zucchini flowers filled with mozzarella and anchovies, battered and deep-fried.
Pasta alla gricia – pasta dish with a sauce made with guanciale, black pepper and grated Pecorino Romano.
Penne all'arrabbiata – pasta dish with a sauce made from garlic, tomatoes and dried red chili peppers, cooked in olive oil.
Rigatoni con la pajata – pasta dish with a sauce made with ringed intestines of a milk-fed veal and Pecorino Romano.
Saltimbocca alla Romana – Roman-style veal with prosciutto crudo, sage, white wine, butter and flour. Saltimbocca is a contraction of "salta in bocca", which literally means 'jump in the mouth'.
 Scaloppine alla romana – veal sautéed with fresh baby artichokes.
Spaghetti alla carbonara – pasta dish with a sauce made with egg yolks, guanciale, black pepper and grated Pecorino Romano.
Supplì – fried rice croquettes, either filled with beef ragout and mozzarella, or chicken giblets, mincemeat and provatura.
 Trippa alla romana – tripe cooked with tomato sauce, pennyroyal, chilli pepper, cloves, laurel, celery, carrots and onions and topped with Pecorino Romano.
 Pizza dolce di Beridde - Jewish-style cake prepared during the circumcision feast.

Sources

References

External links

Culture in Rome
Cuisine of Lazio